Caitlin Van Zandt  (born July 17, 1985, in New York City) is an American actor. She is best known for her role on Guiding Light as Ashlee Wolfe, and as Allegra Marie Sacrimoni on the  HBO series, The Sopranos. Despite appearing on the same show, she is not related to Steve Van Zandt.

Career 

Van Zandt got her first film role debut in 2003 in the movie Camp as Ilana. Then in 2006, she won the role of Allegra Marie Sacrimoni on the hit HBO series, The Sopranos.

She has also appeared on Hope & Faith and Queens Supreme.

Personal life 

Van Zandt underwent lap band surgery in 2008; she lost 90 pounds in the year following surgery.

References

External links 
 

1985 births
Living people
American people of Dutch descent
Actresses from New York City
American soap opera actresses
21st-century American women